Carello Lighting is an automotive lighting brand, and a former Italian independent company.

History
The foundation of the original company was in Turin in 1876. Carello S.p.A. (a joint-stock company) was formed in 1912. Massimo Carello became Managing Director of the Carello Group in 1980, great-grandson of the founder. The company was also known as Fausto Carello.

Carello Lighting plc (02137398) was founded in the UK. Magneti Marelli bought Carello in 1998.

Structure
The company had a UK factory in Cannock in Staffordshire. In Italy the main factory was in Turin, with other factories in Cumiana, Campiglione-Fenile, and Anagni.

Products
The company made automotive lights, and also wiper blades.

References

External links
Museo Torino (Italian)
Pixel Addressable LED Strip Light
LED vs. Halogen vs. Xenon: Which is Better?

Italian companies established in 1912
Automotive lamps
Cannock
Economy of Staffordshire
Auto parts suppliers of Italy
Manufacturing companies based in Turin
Manufacturing companies established in 1912